Maryonkino is a rural locality (a village) in Karinskoye Rural Settlement, Alexandrovsky District, Vladimir Oblast, Russia. The population was 21 as of 2010. There are 12 streets.

Geography 
Maryonkino is located 39 km southwest of Alexandrov (the district's administrative centre) by road. Afanasovo is the nearest rural locality.

References 

Rural localities in Alexandrovsky District, Vladimir Oblast